Radio Ekattor is a Bangladeshi FM radio station, headquartered in Dhaka. It started broadcasting on 26 March 2015. In the 2018–19 Bangladesh Premier League, the FM station was media partner of Rangpur Riders.

References

2015 establishments in Bangladesh
Organisations based in Dhaka
Radio stations in Bangladesh
Mass media in Dhaka